The Unknown is the sixth studio album by German gothic metal band The Vision Bleak, released on 3 June 2016 through Prophecy Productions. The album was announced by the band on their official Facebook page on 31 October 2015, and a teaser EP containing two tracks that eventually appeared in it, entitled The Kindred of the Sunset, came out on 25 March 2016. A deluxe two-CD box set, containing two bonus tracks, was also released.

The album's cover was provided by Dan Seagrave and was unveiled on 20 March 2016.

Track listing
The album's track list was unveiled on 24 March 2016. "The Whine of the Cemetery Hound" and "The Kindred of the Sunset" originally appeared on the teaser EP The Kindred of the Sunset; a lyric video for the latter was uploaded to Prophecy's official YouTube channel on 24 March. On 31 May 2016, "From Wolf to Peacock" was released online (via Prophecy's YouTube channel). A music video for "Into the Unknown" was released on 14 June 2016.

Trivia
 The lyrics to "Spirits of the Dead" were taken from the first stanza of Edgar Allan Poe's poem of the same name.

Personnel
 Ulf Theodor Schwadorf (Markus Stock) – vocals, guitars, bass, keyboards
 Allen B. Konstanz (Tobias Schönemann) – vocals, drums, keyboards
 Martin Koller – production
 Dan Seagrave – cover art
 Łukasz Jaszak – photography

References

The Vision Bleak albums
2016 albums
Albums with cover art by Dan Seagrave